David Lewis Gedge (born 23 April 1960, in Bramley, Leeds, West Yorkshire, England) is an English musician and songwriter.

Early life
Gedge grew up in Middleton, Greater Manchester, in the area known as Top of Hebers. He attended Hollin High School, which became the Queen Elizabeth School and was eventually rebuilt as St Anne's Academy. He studied at the University of Leeds, graduating with a Bachelor of Science degree in Mathematics in 1981.

Musical career
Gedge, together with Peter Solowka, fellow founder member of The Wedding Present, met Keith Gregory, an English student, by placing an advert for a bass player in the Leeds University Union.

He is the main songwriter and vocalist in the bands The Wedding Present and Cinerama. He sang a duet with Marine Research on their 1999 Peel Session.

Quotes

References

1960 births
Living people
English male singers
English songwriters
English rock guitarists
The Wedding Present members
Alumni of the University of Leeds
People from Middleton, Greater Manchester
People educated at St Anne's Academy
English male guitarists
Musicians from Leeds
British male songwriters